Viscachayoc (possibly from Quechua wisk'acha viscacha -yuq a suffix, "the one with viscachas") also spelled Huisca Chayoc, is a mountain in the Andes of Peru which reaches a height of approximately  . It is located in the Apurímac Region, Chincheros Province, Uranmarca  District.

References

Mountains of Peru
Mountains of Apurímac Region